Huang Zuping (born 1963-06-11) is an Olympic equestrian sportsman for China. His best performance is coming 6th place at the 2008 Germany Hagen Qualification. He will compete at the 2008 Summer Olympics in Beijing in the show jumping events.

References

1963 births
Living people
Chinese male equestrians
Equestrians at the 2008 Summer Olympics
Olympic equestrians of China
Sportspeople from Shanghai
Show jumping riders